The 33rd Young Artist Awards ceremony, presented by the Young Artist Association, honored excellence of young performers between the ages of 5 to 21 in the fields of film, television, theater and music for the year 2011.  Nominees were announced on Saturday March 31, 2012.  Winners were announced on Sunday May 6, 2012 in the Empire Ballroom of the Sportsmen's Lodge in Studio City, California.

Established in 1978 by long-standing Hollywood Foreign Press Association member, Maureen Dragone, the Young Artist Association was the first organization to establish an awards ceremony specifically set to recognize and award the contributions of performers under the age of 21 in the fields of film, television, theater and music.

Categories
★ Bold indicates the winner in each category.

Best Performance in a Feature Film

Best Performance in a Feature Film - Leading Young Actor
★ Dakota Goyo - Real Steel - DreamWorks Pictures
Asa Butterfield - Hugo - Paramount Pictures
Joel Courtney - Super 8 - Paramount Pictures
Nathan Gamble - Dolphin Tale - Warner Bros.
Brian Gilbert - The Son of No One - Anchor Bay
Zachary Gordon - Diary of a Wimpy Kid: Rodrick Rules - 20th Century Fox
José Julián - A Better Life - Summit Entertainment

Best Performance in a Feature Film - Leading Young Actress
★ Chloë Grace Moretz - Hugo - Paramount Pictures
Jordana Beatty - Judy Moody and the Not Bummer Summer - Relativity Media
Elle Fanning - Super 8 - Paramount Pictures
Saoirse Ronan - Hanna - Focus Features
Ariel Winter - The Chaperone - Samuel Goldwyn Films

Best Performance in a Feature Film - Supporting Young Actor
★ Matthew J. Evans - Bad Teacher - Columbia Pictures
Jonah Bobo - Crazy, Stupid, Love - Warner Bros.
Karan Brar - Diary of a Wimpy Kid: Rodrick Rules - 20th Century Fox
Robert Capron - Diary of a Wimpy Kid: Rodrick Rules - 20th Century Fox
Mason Cook - Spy Kids: All the Time in the World - Dimension Films
Colin Ford - We Bought a Zoo - 20th Century Fox
Griffin Gluck - Just Go With It - Columbia Pictures
Zach Mills - Super 8 - Paramount Pictures

Best Performance in a Feature Film - Supporting Young Actress
★ Laine MacNeil - Diary of a Wimpy Kid: Rodrick Rules - 20th Century Fox
Bailey Anne Borders - The Change-Up - Universal
Sammy Boyarsky - Rampart - Millennium Entertainment
Kaitlyn Dever - Bad Teacher - Columbia Pictures
Alix Kermes - Prodigal - Lost Coin Productions
Bella King - Red Riding Hood - Warner Bros.
Bailee Madison - Just Go With It - Columbia Pictures
Stefanie Scott - No Strings Attached - Paramount Pictures
Cozi Zuehlsdorff - Dolphin Tale - Warner Bros.
Amanda Nichole Manis - The 5th Quarter - Rocky Mountain Pictures

Best Performance in a Feature Film - Young Actor Ten and Under
★ Riley Thomas Stewart - The Beaver - Summit Entertainment
Andrew Astor - Insidious - Film District/TriStar
Preston Bailey - Judy Moody and the Not Bummer Summer - Relativity Media
Peter Bundic - Rise of the Planet of the Apes - 20th Century Fox
Connor & Owen Fielding - Diary of a Wimpy Kid: Rodrick Rules - 20th Century Fox
Sean Michael Kyer - Everything and Everyone - Take a Bow Entertainment
Robbie Tucker - Prom - Walt Disney Pictures

Best Performance in a Feature Film - Young Actress Ten and Under
★ (tie) Emma Rayne Lyle - I Don't Know How She Does It - The Weinstein Company
★ (tie) Amara Miller - The Descendents - Fox Searchlight Pictures
Dalila Bela - Diary of a Wimpy Kid: Rodrick Rules - 20th Century Fox
Rowan Blanchard - Spy Kids: All the Time in the World - Dimension Films
Megan Charpentier - Red Riding Hood - Warner Bros.
Maggie Elizabeth Jones - We Bought a Zoo - 20th Century Fox
Arcadia Kendal - Sacrifice - Millennium Entertainment

Best Performance in a Feature Film - Young Ensemble Cast
★ Judy Moody and the Not Bummer Summer - Relativity Media
Jordana Beatty, Preston Bailey, Parris Mosteller, Garrett Ryan, Ashley Boettcher, Taylar Hender, Cameron Boyce, Jackson Odell
Super 8 - Paramount Pictures
Joel Courtney, Elle Fanning, Ryan Lee, Zack Mills, Riley Griffiths, Gabriel Basso, Britt Flatmo

Best Performance in an International Feature Film

Best Performance in an International Feature Film - Leading Young Performer
★ (tie) Antoine Olivier Pilon - Thrill of the Hills (Frisson des collines) - Canada
★ (tie) Julia Sarah Stone - The Year Dolly Parton Was My Mom - Canada
Guillermo Campra - Águila Roja, la película (Red Eagle: The Movie) - Spain
Thomas Doret - Le gamin au vélo (The Kid with a Bike) - Belgium
Zoé Héran - Tomboy - France
Stella Kunkat - Dschungelkind (Jungle Child) - Germany
Adrian Moore - Der ganz große Traum (The Ultimate Big Dream) - Germany
Theo Trebs - Der ganz große Traum (The Ultimate Big Dream) - Germany

Best Performance in a Short Film

Best Performance in a Short Film - Young Actor
★ Ryan Grantham - Liz - UBC Film Productions
Andy Scott Harris - From Darkness - Independent
Nicky Korba - Coach Ricardo - Grovestreet Ent.
Daniel Lupetina - My Guy - Simonee Films
Matthew Nardozzi - An Ordinary Summer Day - Independent
Anthony Restivo - Fable - Independent
Jason Spevack - Oliver Bumps Birthday - CFC

Best Performance in a Short Film - Young Actress
★ (tie) Sarah de la Isla - The Aerial Girl - Mother Horse Productions
★ (tie) Ashley McGullam - Re-Abduction - Choto/Nygaard Production
★ (tie) Ashley Lynn Switzer - Ruby Slippers - Barefoot Girl Productions
Ava Allen - Becoming - Dustin Todd Films
Ashlee Fuss - Haven's Point - Majek Pictures
Cassidi Hoag - Parkdale - CFC
Savannah Lathem - Vanilla Promises - One Eyed Wonder Muscle
Camryn Molnar - The Ultimate Conquest - Nikita Zubarev Production
Angelique Restivo - Fable - Independent
Rebecca Spicher - Certified - Hollywood Shorts
Julia Sarah Stone - Ellipse - Alice Deegan Production
Brandi Alyssa Young - Broken Pieces - Denver Crazies Prod.

Best Performance in a Short Film - Young Actor Ten and Under
★ Dawson Dunbar - Bred In Captivity - Simon Fraser University
Felix Avitia - Ingles - Independent
Brady Bryson - Mama - C-Zan
Joshua Costea - Lemons and Lemonade - Independent
Sean Michael Ryer - Shh! - Means of Production
Daven Pitkin - Why does God Hate Me - Capilano University
Aiden Wessel - Irreplaceable - SFU Film

Best Performance in a Short Film - Young Actress Ten and Under
★ Dalila Bela - Joanna Makes a Friend - Broken Mirror Films
Vanessa Evancic - Liz - UBC Film Productions
Merit Leighton - Monster Slayer - Independent
Katelyn Mager - Joanna Makes a Friend - Broken Mirror Films
Sierra Pitkin - Dead Friends - Crazy 8's

Best Performance in a TV Movie, Miniseries or Special

Best Performance in a TV Movie, Miniseries or Special - Leading Young Actor
★ Nicholas Stargel - Oliver's Ghost - Hallmark
Connor Gibbs - A Crush on You - Hallmark
Joey Luthman - The Joey and Elise Show - DATV
Anthony Robinson - Hercules Saves Christmas - Animal Planet
Christopher Saavedra - We Have Your Husband - Lifetime

Best Performance in a TV Movie, Miniseries or Special - Leading Young Actress
★ Jada Facer - Love's Christmas Journey - Hallmark
Elise Luthman - The Joey and Elise Show - DATV
Kiernan Shipka - Smooch - Hallmark

Best Performance in a TV Movie, Miniseries or Special - Supporting Young Actor
★ Liam McKanna - Beyond the Blackboard - Hallmark
Brennan Bailey - The Dog Who Saved Halloween - ABC Family Channel
Matthew Knight - The Good Witch's Family - Hallmark
Robert Naylor - Cyberbully - ABC Family Channel
Raymond Ochoa - Other People's Kids - ABC Studio
Bruce Salomon - Deck the Halls - TNT
Riley Thomas Stewart - A Christmas Wedding Tail - Hallmark

Best Performance in a TV Movie, Miniseries or Special - Supporting Young Actress
★ (tie) Caitlin Carmichael - Bag of Bones - A&E TV
★ (tie) Kirstin Dorn - A Christmas Wish - Hallmark
Megan Charpentier - He Loves Me - Lifetime
Olivia Steele Falconer - A Fairly Odd Movie: Grow Up, Timmy Turner! - Nickelodeon
Hannah Leigh - Meet Jane - Lifetime
Savannah McReynolds - Beyond the Blackboard - Hallmark
Quinn McColgan - Mildred Pierce - HBO
Olivia Scriven - Mistletoe Over Manhattan - Hallmark
Morgan Turner - Mildred Pierce - HBO

Best Performance in a TV Series

Best Performance in a TV Series - Leading Young Actor
★ (tie) Dylan Everett - Wingin' It - Family Channel
★ (tie) Jared Gilmore - Once Upon a Time - ABC
Devan Cohen - The Yard - Movie Central
Will Jester - Debra! - Family Channel
Matthew Knight - My Babysitter's a Vampire - Disney Channel
Daniel Lupetina - The Yard - Movie Central
Chandler Riggs - The Walking Dead - AMC

Best Performance in a TV Series - Leading Young Actress
★ (tie) Cristine Prosperi - Degrassi: The Next Generation - CTV
★ (tie) Niamh Wilson - Debra! - Family Channel
Sami Gayle - Blue Bloods - CBS
Jillian Rose Reed - Awkward. - MTV
Bella Thorne - Shake It Up - Disney Channel
Zendaya - Shake It Up - Disney Channel

Best Performance in a TV Series - Supporting Young Actor
★ (tie) Karan Brar - Jessie - Disney Channel
★ (tie) Maxim Knight - Falling Skies - TNT
Max Burkholder - Parenthood - NBC
Jake Johnson - Man Up! - ABC
Austin MacDonald - Debra! - Family Channel
Bradley Steven Perry - Good Luck Charlie - Disney Channel

Best Performance in a TV Series - Supporting Young Actress
★ Stefanie Scott - A.N.T. Farm - Disney Channel
Ciara Bravo - Big Time Rush - Nickelodeon
Kaitlyn Dever - Last Man Standing - ABC
Caitlyn Taylor Love - I'm in the Band - Disney Channel

Best Performance in a TV Series - Guest Starring Young Actor 18-21
★ Ryan Malgarini - Mike & Molly - CBS
Scott Beaudin - Haven - SYFY
Max Ehrich - Parenthood - NBC
Cameron Monaghan - Rizzoli & Isles - TNT
Boo Boo Stewart - Good Luck Charlie - Disney Channel

Best Performance in a TV Series - Guest Starring Young Actress 17-21
★ (tie) Kara Pacitto - Pair of Kings - Disney XD
★ (tie) Katelyn Pacitto - Pair of Kings - Disney XD
Katlin Mastandrea - The Middle - ABC
Erin Sanders - CSI: Miami - CBS

Best Performance in a TV Series - Guest Starring Young Actor 14-17
★ Trevor Jackson - Harry's Law - NBC
Sterling Beaumon - Law & Order - NBC
L. J. Benet - Wizards of Waverly Place - Disney Channel
Harrison Boxley - Kickin' It - Disney XD
Ricardo Hoyos - R.L. Stine's The Haunting Hour - The Hub Network
Donnie MacNeil - Hiccups - CTV
Brandon Soo Hoo - Workaholics - Comedy Central
Austin Williams - A Gifted Man - CBS

Best Performance in a TV Series - Guest Starring Young Actress 14-16
★ Rebecca Spicher - Criminal Minds - CBS
Chelsey Bryson - Kickin' It - Disney XD
Sami Gayle - Royal Pains - USA
Laine MacNeil - Shattered - Global Entertainment
Evie Louise Thompson - Shake It Up - Disney Channel

Best Performance in a TV Series - Guest Starring Young Actor 11-13
★ (tie) Austin Michael Coleman - House M.D. - Fox
★ (tie) Baljodh Nagra - R.L. Stine's The Haunting Hour - The Hub Network
Chandler Canterbury - Fringe - Warner Bros.
Zach Callison - I'm in the Band - Disney XD
Zayne Emory - Shake It Up - Disney Channel
Dakota Goyo - R.L. Stine's The Haunting Hour - The Hub Network
Maxim Knight - CSI: Miami - CBS
Connor Levins - Endgame - Endemol Worldwide
Christopher Mastandrea - Hot in Cleveland - TV Land
Regan Mizrahi - White Collar - USA
Jason Spevack - R.L. Stine's The Haunting Hour - The Hub Network
Justin Tinucci - Big Love - HBO
Mateus Ward - Sports Show with Norm Macdonald - Comedy Central

Best Performance in a TV Series - Guest Starring Young Actress 11-13
★ (tie) Cameron Protzman - The Glades - A&E
★ (tie) Haley Pullos - House MD - FOX
Mia Ford - Chase - NBC
Ava Rebecca Hughes - R.L. Stine's The Haunting Hour - The Hub Network
Madison Leisle - Love Bites - NBC
Jessica Mcleod - R.L. Stine's The Haunting Hour - The Hub Network

Best Performance in a TV Series - Guest Starring Young Actor Ten and Under
★ Darien Provost - Mr. Young - Disney XD
Tucker Albrizzi - Big Time Rush - Nickelodeon
Peter Bundic - Eureka - Syfy
Niles Fitch - Tyler Perry's House of Payne - TBS
Connor Gibbs - Memphis Beat - TNT

Best Performance in a TV Series - Guest Starring Young Actress Ten and Under
★ Olivia Steele Falconer - Mr. Young - Disney XD
Melody Angel - NCIS - CBS
Francesca Capaldi - A.N.T. Farm - Disney Channel
Caitlin Carmichael - Shake It Up - Disney Channel
Savannah McReynolds - Private Practice - ABC
Shyloh Oostwald - House MD - FOX
Danielle Parker - CSI: Miami - CBS
Marlowe Peyton - The Middle - ABC
Malinda Rose Sass - The World's Astonishing News - NTV

Best Performance in a TV Series - Recurring Young Actor 17-21
★ (tie) Brock Ciarlelli - The Middle - ABC
★ (tie) A.J. Saudin  - Degrassi: The Next Generation - CTV
James Coholen - Debra! - Family Channel
Damien Haas - So Random! - Disney Channel
Matthew Fahey - Awkward. - MTV

Best Performance in a TV Series - Recurring Young Actress 17-21
★ Erin Sanders - Big Time Rush - Nickelodeon
Alexandria DeBerry - A.N.T. Farm - Disney Channel
Kelly Heyer - Raising Hope - Fox
Victoria Justice - iCarly - Nickelodeon
Bridgit Mendler - Wizards of Waverly Place - Disney Channel

Best Performance in a TV Series - Recurring Young Actor
★ Zayne Emory - I'm in the Band - Disney Channel
Buddy Handleson - Shake It Up - Disney Channel
Austin MacDonald - Living in Your Car - Movie Central
Brando Soo Hoo - Supah Ninjas - Nickelodeon
Tyler Stentiford - Flashpoint - CTV
Brady & Connor Noon - Boardwalk Empire - HBO

Best Performance in a TV Series - Recurring Young Actress
★ Frédérique Dufort - Tactik - Télé-Québec
Ava Allan - True Jackson, VP - Nickelodeon
Kaitlyn Dever - Justified - FX
Hannah Leigh - Kickin' It - Disney Channel
Madison Leisle - The Walking Dead - AMC
Lauren Owens - New Girl - Fox

Best Performance in a TV Series - Recurring Young Actress Ten and Under
★ Emily Alyn Lind - Revenge - ABC
Mackenzie Aladjem - Nurse Jackie - Showtime
Camden Angelis - Debra! - Family Channel
Lucy and Josie Gallina - Boardwalk Empire - HBO
Nikki Hahn - Jimmy Kimmel Live! - ABC

Best Performance in a Daytime TV Series - Young Actor
★ (tie) Andrew Trischitta - One Life to Live - ABC
★ (tie) Austin Williams - One Life to Live - ABC
Aramis Knight - General Hospital - ABC
Garrett Ryan - The Young and the Restless - CBS
Aaron Sanders - General Hospital - ABC

Best Performance in a Daytime TV Series - Young Actress
★ Haley Pullos - General Hospital - ABC
Lexi Ainsworth - General Hospital - ABC
Ellery Sprayberry - The Young and the Restless - CBS

Best Performance in a Daytime TV Series - Young Actor 12 and Under
★ (tie) Tate Berney - All My Children - ABC
★ (tie) Robbie Tucker - The Young and the Restless - CBS
Jake Vaughn - All My Children - ABC

Best Performance in a Daytime TV Series - Young Actress Ten and Under
★ Danielle Parker - All My Children - ABC
Mackenzie Aladjem - All My Children - ABC
Lauren Boles - Days of Our Lives - NBC
Dannika Liddell - All My Children - ABC

Outstanding Young Ensemble in a TV Series
★ ''Debra! - Family ChannelNiamh Wilson, Will Jester, Austin MacDonald, Alicia Josipovich, James Coholan, Camden AngelisThe Yard - Movie Central
Keana Bastidas, Alex Cardillo, Devan Cohen, Quintin Colantoni, Shemar Charles, Daniel Lupetina, Sarah Cramner, John Fleming, Olivia Scriven, Jared Karp, Slam Yu
Shake It Up - Disney Channel
Zendaya, Bella Thorne, Davis Cleveland, Adam Irigoyen, Kenton Duty, Caroline Sunshine, Roshon Fegan

Best Performance in a Voice-Over Role
Best Performance in a Voice-Over Role - Young Actor
★ (tie) Colin Ford - Jake and the Never Land Pirates - Disney★ (tie) Graeme Jokic - Franklin and Friends - Nelvanna Com★ (tie) Mark Ramsay - Franklin and Friends - Nelvanna ComJacob Ewaniuk - The Cat in the Hat Knows a Lot About That! - PBS
Jet Jurgensmeyer - Special Agent Oso - Disney Jr
John Paul Ruttan - Doodlebops Rockin' Road Show - CBC
Jake Sim - Stella and Sam - Family Channel

Best Performance in a Voice-Over Role - Young Actress
★ (tie) Grace Rolek - Happiness Is a Warm Blanket, Charlie Brown - Warner Home Video★ (tie) Alexandria Suarez - Dora the Explorer - NickelodeonAbigail Breslin - Rango - Paramount Pictures
Nissae Isen - My Big Big Friend - Treehouse TV (as Yuri)
Emily Alyn Lind - Prep and Landing - Disney
Ramona Marquez - Arthur Christmas - Sony Pictures

Best Performance in a DVD Film
Best Performance in a DVD Film - Young Ensemble Cast
★ Spooky Buddies - Walt Disney Home EntertainmentSkyler Gisondo, Tucker Albrizzi, Sierra McCormick, Jake Johnson, Sage RyanMonster Mutt - Monster Muttt & Burnside Entertainment
Rhiannon Leigh Wryn, Billy Unger, China Anderson

Best Performance in Live Theater
Best Performance in Live Theater - Young Actor
★ (tie) L.J. Benet - To Kill a Mockingbird - Lex Theatre, CA★ (tie) Aiden Eyrick - Jerusalem - Music Box Theatre, NYDusan Brown - The Lion King - Auditorium Theatre, NY
Niles Fitch - The Lion King - North American Tour
Andy Scott Harris - South Street - Pasadena Playhouse, CA
Jonah Lloyd - Once Upon a Dream - The It Factor Theatre, CA
Matthew Nardozzi - 13: The Musical - Fringe Festival, FL
Jordan Wessel - Great Expectations - Gateway Theatre, Vancouver
Lewis Grosso - Mary Poppins - New Amsterdam Theatre, NY

Best Performance in Live Theater - Young Actress
★ Hannah Lloyd - Once Upon a Dream - The It Factor Theatre, CALauren Delfs - Fever Chart - Eclipse Theatre, Chicago
Kara Oates - Mary Poppins - New Amsterdam Theatre, NY
Eden Sanaa Duncan Smith - The Lion King - Minskoff Theatre, NY
Jolie Vanier - Once On This Island - Palmer Cultural Center, Switzerland

Special awards
Outstanding Instrumentalist
★ Rio Mangini – Pianist / Actor / ArtistMichael Landon Award
★ Ethan Flower – Inspirational Actor to YouthSocial Relations of Knowledge Institute Award
★ Black Gold'' – truTV

References

External links
Official site
33rd Young Artist Awards at Getty Images
33rd Young Artist Awards at WireImage

Young Artist Awards ceremonies
2011 film awards
2011 television awards
2012 in American cinema
2012 in American television
2012 in California